Teenager is the third album from Irish band The Thrills. It was released on July 22, 2007 in Ireland and three days later in Europe. The first single from the album was "Nothing Changes Around Here". The second release taken from the album was "The Midnight Choir" which was released as a download-only single. Teenager reached No. 48 on the UK Albums Chart.

The album was demoed and written in Ireland, with the band recording and mixing the album in Vancouver and California.

The Thrills were dropped by EMI after the poor sales performance of Teenager.<ref name=Lauria>Lauria, Peter and Garrity, Brian (15 January 2008). Hands' Pink Slips, The New York Post, Retrieved on 2 July 2008.</ref>

The cover photograph, Wild Horses, 1979, is by Joseph Szabo.

Track listing
 "The Midnight Choir" – 3:41
 "This Year" – 2:55
 "Nothing Changes Around Here" – 4:12
 "Restaurant" – 3:27
 "I Came All This Way" – 3:40
 "Long Forgotten Song" – 3:16
 "I'm So Sorry" – 2:52
 "No More Empty Words" – 3:23
 "Teenager" – 3:25
 "Should've Known Better" – 3:30
 "There's Joy to Be Found … The Boy Who Caught All the Breaks" – 6:34
Deluxe Edition Bonus Tracks
  "The End of Innocence" – 3:24 
 "Suzanne" – 3:07
 "One Horse Town" – 3:14

Personnel

Musicians
Conor Deasy (Vocals, Harmonica, Acoustic Guitar)
Daniel Ryan (Guitars, Bass, Mandolin, Banjo, Backing Vocals)
Pádraic McMahon (Bass, Guitars, Backing Vocals)
Kevin Horan (Piano, Organs, Backing Vocals)
Ben Carrigan (Drums and Percussion)

Mixing and production
Tony Hoffer (who produced So Much for the City'') produced and mixed the entire album except for Track 3, which was mixed by Bob Clearmountain.

Release history

References

The Thrills albums
2007 albums
Albums produced by Tony Hoffer
Virgin Records albums